Vainberg is a surname. It may refer to:

 Boris Rufimovich Vainberg, Russian mathematician
 Mieczysław Weinberg (also spelled Moisei Vainberg), Soviet composer

See also 
 Weinberg (disambiguation)
 Weinberger

Jewish surnames
Yiddish-language surnames